Pseudicius athleta is a jumping spider species in the genus Pseudicius that lives in Kenya and Uganda. It was first described by Wanda Wesołowska in 2011.

References

Arthropods of Kenya
Arthropods of Uganda
Salticidae
Spiders described in 2011
Spiders of Africa
Taxa named by Wanda Wesołowska